Frances Fox Piven (born October 10, 1932) is an American professor of political science and sociology at The Graduate Center, City University of New York, where she has taught since 1982.

Piven is known equally for her contributions to social theory and for her social activism. A veteran of the war on poverty and subsequent welfare-rights protests both in New York City and on the national stage, she has been instrumental in formulating the theoretical underpinnings of those movements. Over the course of her career, she has served on the boards of the ACLU and the Democratic Socialists of America, and has also held offices in several professional associations, including the American Political Science Association and the Society for the Study of Social Problems. Previously, she had been a member of the political science faculty at Boston University.

Life and education
Piven was born in Calgary, Alberta, Canada, of Russian Jewish immigrant parents, Rachel (née Paperny) and Albert Fox, a storekeeper. Piven immigrated to the United States when she was one and was naturalized as a United States citizen in 1953. She was raised in Jackson Heights, Queens, New York.  She attended P.S. 148 and Newtown High School. She received a B.A. in City Planning in 1953, an M.A. in 1956, and a Ph.D. in 1962, all from the University of Chicago. She attended on a scholarship and she waitressed for living expenses. Piven's dissertation at the University of Chicago was directed by Edward C. Banfield.

Career
Piven was married to her long-time collaborator Richard Cloward until his death in 2001. Together with Cloward, she wrote an article in the May 1966 issue of The Nation titled "The Weight of the Poor: A Strategy to End Poverty" advocating increased enrollment in social welfare programs in order to collapse that system and force reforms, leading to a guaranteed annual income. This political strategy has been referred to as the "Cloward–Piven strategy". During 2006/07 Piven served as the President of the American Sociological Association.

While at Boston University, she and her political science department colleagues Murray Levin and Howard Zinn refused to go back to work after the settlement of the 1979 Boston University strike. Clerical and support staff had also gone out on strike at the time of the AAUP, and Piven, Levin, Zinn and others refused to cross their picket line, holding their classes elsewhere in solidarity with the unresolved strike. The "B.U. Five" were threatened with dismissal by B.U. President John Silber.

Silber later backed down, and Piven and the others eventually returned to the classroom.  Piven eventually left B.U. for C.U.N.Y.

Activism and legislation
Throughout her career, Piven has combined academic work with political action. In 1968, she signed the "Writers and Editors War Tax Protest" pledge, vowing to refuse tax payments in protest against the Vietnam War. In 1983 she co-founded Human SERVE (Service Employees Registration and Voter Education), an organization with the goal of increasing voter registration by linking voter registration offerings with the use of social services or state Departments of Motor Vehicles. Human SERVE's initiative was incorporated by the National Voter Registration Act of 1993, colloquially known as the "Motor Voter Bill".

She is a member of the Democratic Socialists of America and serves as one of the eight honorary chairs of that organization.

Piven also engaged Milton Friedman and Thomas Sowell in a debate in the PBS television series Free to Choose.

Writings
Some of Piven's major works include Regulating the Poor written with Richard Cloward, first published in 1972 and updated in 1993, which is a scrutiny of government welfare policy and how it is used to exert power over lower class individuals; Poor People's Movements, published in 1977, an analysis of how rebellious social movements can induce important reforms; Why Americans Don't Vote, published in 1988 and a follow up book Why Americans Still Don't Vote published in 2000, each of which look at the role of current American electoral practices which tend to discourage the poor working class from exercising their right to vote;The War at Home published in 2004, a critical examination of the domestic results of the wars initiated by the Bush administration; Challenging Authority: How Ordinary People Change America, a look at the interaction of disruptive social movements and electoral politics in generating the political force for democratic reform in American history.

Honors and awards
Bronislaw Malinowski Award (2015)
American Sociological Association Career Award for the Practice of Sociology (2000)
Charles McCoy Career Achievement Award of the Caucus for a New Political Science of the American Political Science Association (2004)
Mary Lepper Award of the Women's Caucus of the American Political Science Association (1998)
American Sociology Association Lifetime Achievement Award for Political Sociology
Tides Foundation Award for Excellence in Public Advocacy (1995)
Annual Award of the National Association of Secretaries of State (1994)
President's Award of the American Public Health Association (1993)
Lee/Founders Award of the Society for the Study of Social Problems
Eugene V. Debs Foundation Prize
C. Wright Mills Award

Works
 Labor Parties in Postindustrial Societies (Oxford University Press, 1992)
 The War at Home: The Domestic Costs of Bush's Militarism (New Press, 2004)
 Challenging Authority: How Ordinary People Change America (Rowman and Littlefield, 2006)
 Lessons for Our Struggle (Haymarket Books, 2011)

with Richard Cloward:
 Regulating the Poor: The Functions of Public Welfare (Pantheon, 1971, 2nd ed: Vintage, 1993)
 Poor People's Movements: Why They Succeed, How They Fail (Pantheon, 1977)
 New Class War: Reagan's Attack on the Welfare State and Its Consequences (Pantheon, 1982)
 Why Americans Don't Vote (Pantheon, 1988)
 The Breaking of the American Social Compact (New Press, 1997)
 Why Americans Still Don't Vote: And Why Politicians Want it That Way (Beacon, 2000)
 Who’s Afraid of Frances Fox Piven? The Essential Writings of the Professor Glenn Beck Loves to Hate  2011 The New Press 

with Lee Staples and Richard Cloward:
Roots to Power: A Manual for Grassroots Organizing (Praeger, 1984)

with Lorraine Minnite and Margaret Groarke:
 Keeping Down the Black Vote: Race and the Demobilization of American Voters (New Press, 2009)

The Frances Fox Piven Papers are held by Smith College.

References

External links
Frances Fox Piven faculty page at CUNY Graduate Center
Column archives at The Nation

Frances Fox Piven Papers at the Sophia Smith Collection, Smith College Special Collections

American sociologists
American women political scientists
American political scientists
American political writers
American social sciences writers
American tax resisters
Presidents of the American Sociological Association
Members of the Democratic Socialists of America
Graduate Center, CUNY faculty
City University of New York faculty
CUNY School of Labor and Urban Studies faculty
University of Chicago alumni
American people of Canadian descent
1932 births
Living people
American people of Russian-Jewish descent
American women sociologists
Jewish American writers
Writers from Calgary
Jewish American scientists
Jewish socialists
Writers about activism and social change